Juventus Next Gen, also known as Juve Next Gen or Juve NG, is a professional football club based in Turin, Piedmont, Italy, which acts as the reserve team of  club Juventus.

Following the reintroduction of reserve teams in Italy, Juventus U23 was formed in 2018 and was registered to Serie C, the third level of the Italian league system. In the first years, the team reached the promotion play-off stages of Serie C, without gaining promotion. In the 2019–20 season, under coach Fabio Pecchia, Juventus U23 won the Coppa Italia Serie C after defeating Ternana in the final. The club changed its name to Juventus Next Gen in 2022.

Due to the nature of the club as a reserve team, Juventus Next Gen needs to comply to certain regulations, such as not being eligible for promotion to Serie A and not competing in the Coppa Italia, the major national cup. The club, and in general FIGC's reserve-team project, has faced a lot of criticism, especially from fans of other Serie C teams due to their perceived lack of history.

History

Predecessors (1904–1976)

On 17 April 1904, the second team of Juventus lost the final 4–0 to Genoa II at the Ponte Carrega field. On 2 April 1905, after a 3–0 away win to AC Milan II, Juventus II obtained the mathematical certainy of first place at the final three-team group stage to win their only Seconda Categoria trophy.

Juventus U23 (2018–2022)
Juventus U23 were founded on 3 August 2018, following the reintroduction of professional reserve teams in Italian football after over 40 years, and was officially admitted to the Serie C championship.

On 21 August, Luca Zanimacchia became the first scorer of the team's history after scoring the only goal in a 1–0 win over Cuneo in the group stage of the Coppa Italia Serie C. Juventus U23's first game in Serie C was a 2–1 away defeat to Alessandria, with Claudio Zappa scoring the team's first league goal. Juventus U23 ended their first season in 12th place with 42 points in 37 games, and were eliminated in the group stage of the Coppa Italia Serie C.

In the 2019–20 season, coached by Fabio Pecchia, Juventus U23 won the Coppa Italia Serie C after beating Ternana 2–1 in the final on 27 June 2020. The club won its first trophy in their second year as a professional club.

Juventus Next Gen (2022–present)
On 26 August 2022, the club changed its name to Juventus Next Gen.

Stadium

Juventus Next Gen does not own their own stadium, and share the Stadio Giuseppe Moccagatta with Alessandria as their home stadium. Although there had been an agreement among the two parts shortly after Juventus' reserve team's foundation, Alessandria's fans protested to not share their stadium. According to the agreement, Juventus Next Gen fans can sit only in the guests sector. Their players train at the Juventus Training Center in Vinovo.

On 27 November 2022, Juventus Next Gen played exceptionally a match against Mantova at the Juventus Stadium, the first team home ground, in which tickets were free. The match was drawn 2–2, with Simone Iocolano scoring a brace for Juventus Next Gen and was seen by 28,572 fans present at the stadium. On 3 March 2023, the Juventus Stadium also hosted the first leg of the  final between Juventus Next Gen and Vicenza with an attendance of 21,572 spectators and with Juventus Next Gen losing 2–1.

Regulations
Juventus Next Gen play in the same professional league system as their senior team, rather than a separate league dedicated for youth teams. However, the reserve team may not play in the same division or higher as their senior team, nor in the Coppa Italia, making Juventus Next Gen ineligible for promotion to the Serie A. Should both Juventus and Juventus Next Gen qualify in the same league, the reserve team must play in the league immediately below. In case of relegation to the Serie D, it may not register for this league and their activity is suspended. After one season, it may request the team be registered to the Serie C in case of vacancy. Juventus must pay an annual extraordinary fee of €1.2 million to have the reserve team registered to Serie C. In addition, Juventus may not take part to Lega Pro assemblies.

They may insert a maximum of 23 players in their team sheets. Only four players aged more than 23 when the season started may be inserted in the team sheets. Up to a maximum of seven players who had been registered to a FIGC-affiliated club for less than seven sporting seasons may be included in the match list.

In order to be eligible to play for Juventus Next Gen, players must have not been registered to the 25-man list of Serie A players and must have played at most 50 Serie A matches. Instead, to be eligible to play in promotion play-offs and in relegation play-outs, players must have not played over 25 first-team league matches of at least 30 minutes. If a player is suspended, he is unusable in both the first and reserve teams. Suspensions must be served in the team with whom he committed the infraction.

Criticism

Juventus' reserve team and the second-team project itself led by FIGC have faced a lot of criticism. On 28 July 2018, before the team's official foundation, Sicula Leonzio president Giuseppe Leonardo criticised Juventus' choice to form their reserve team by saying: "Reserve teams are a flop, an experiment that does not lead to anywhere. Juventus B are going to be harmful and will distort the championship: they are not a newly-promoted team but they are certainly going to be strong, we have seen this in women's football that the Bianconeri don't make a bad impression wherever they put their effort". In August 2018, Sportitalia director Michele Criscitellio criticised the second-team project by stating: "The mission of Juve[ntus] B was to get their youngsters to play and not to take away a place from the Serie C clubs to reach the Serie B. The buying power is so different that there would be no competition. It is pointless to make investments for whoever Juventus will end up in the group".

In December 2018, Pisa's fans attacked Juventus U23 by stating, in an official statement: "B teams are an insult to the dignity of those who consider the Lega Pro their own Serie A", further noting that Pisa should not act as a "sparring partner" for "youngsters without a stadium and history". The fans also defected the two league matches against Juventus U23 in the 2018–19 Serie C. In September 2019, Arezzo's fans flew a banner in front of their bus saying "No to B teams". They too defected the match against them as they had done in April.

In November 2021, Padova's fans considered Juventus U23 a "Super League franchise" and defected the two league matches against them. In July 2022, Lega Serie B president Mauro Balata expressed dissent towards reserve teams playing in Serie B, saying: "Our league embraces big and important cities. If another league wants to continue with this second-team project they can do so, but without affecting our rights and our history. It is not fair".

Players

Current squad

Youth sector

Notable players

This list includes players that have appeared in at least one top-league and/or senior international game.

 Giacomo Vrioni
 Enzo Barrenechea
 Matías Soulé
 Koni De Winter
 Daouda Peeters
 David Wesley
 Kaio Jorge
 Grigoris Kastanos
 Samuel Iling-Junior
 Stephy Mavididi
 Marley Aké
 Tommaso Barbieri
 Marco Da Graca
 Alessandro Di Pardo
 Nicolò Fagioli
 Gianluca Frabotta
 Paolo Gozzi
 Fabio Miretti
 Simone Muratore
 Hans Nicolussi
 Marco Olivieri
 Manolo Portanova
 Luca Zanimacchia
 Martin Palumbo
 Félix Correia
 Matheus Pereira
 Radu Drăgușin
 Hamza Rafia
 Franco Israel

Coaching staff

Managerial history
Below is a list of Juventus Next Gen managers from 2018 until the present day.

Season to season

Honours
Coppa Italia Serie C
Winners (1): 2019–20

See also
Juventus F.C. Youth Sector

Notes

References

Sources

External links

Juventus Next Gen at Soccerway

 
2018 establishments in Italy
Association football clubs established in 2018
Italian reserve football teams
Football clubs in Turin
Serie C clubs
Coppa Italia Serie C winning clubs